D. Jayakanthan (24 April 1934 – 8 April 2015), popularly known as JK, was an Indian writer, journalist, orator, filmmaker, critic and activist. Born in Cuddalore, he dropped out of school at the age of 9 and went to Madras, where he joined the Communist Party of India. In a career spanning six decades, he authored around 40 novels, 200 short stories, apart from two autobiographies. Outside literature, he made two films. In addition, four of his other novels were adapted into films by others.

Jayakanthan's literary honours include Jnanpith and Sahitya Akademi awards. He was also a recipient of Padma Bhushan (2009), India's third-highest civilian honour, the Soviet Land Nehru Award (1978), and the Russian government's Order of Friendship (2011).

Biography
Jayakanthan was born in 1934 into a family of agriculturists in Manjakuppam, a suburb of Cuddalore, a part of the South Arcot District of the erstwhile Madras Presidency. Brought up by his mother and maternal uncles, he got interested in politics at a young age as his uncles were actively involved in it. As a child, he was highly inspired by the works of Subramania Bharati. Jayakanthan dropped himself out of school after completing fifth grade, as he thought studies would hinder his political activism. 

In 1946, he left for Madras (now Chennai) in search of livelihood, where he performed odd jobs, before ending up as a compositor in the printing press of Communist Party of India (CPI). His association with the CPI, instilled the ideas of the movement, where he got to accompany leaders such as P. Jeevanandham, Baladandayutham and S. Ramakrishnan. The leaders of the party encouraged him to write. After graduating to an active member of the party, he got to learn about topics pertaining to world literature, culture, politics, economics and journalism. It was during this time, Jayakanthan started writing for pro-communist magazines. Over the next few years, he established himself as one of the top-most writers in the party.  His early works were first published in the party newspaper Janasakthi, and soon other magazines like Sarasvathi, Thamarai, Santhi, Manithan, Sakthi and Samaran published his works. His early works focussed on the plight of slum-dwellers who were settled in and around the party office.

Jayakanthan wrote his first short story for a Tamil magazine titled Sowbakiyavathi, which got it published in 1953. Following early success, Jayakanthan started writing for mainstream magazines such as Ananda Vikatan, Kumudam and Dinamani Kadir, who published a number of short-stories particularly in the 1960s. In 1964, Jayakanthan entered films by co-producing and directing a venture titled Unnaipol Oruvan, based on his novel. The film focussed on the plight of slum-dwellers. Although a commercial failure, it won the President's Certificate of Merit for the Third Best Feature Film in 1965. The following year he made another film based on his namesake novel Yaarukkaga Azhudhaan which had Nagesh playing the lead role. His novel Sila Nerangalil Sila Manithargal (1970) won him the Sahitya Akademi Award (for Tamil) in 1972. Later this was adapted into a film of the same name by A. Bhimsingh, which won a National Film Award. Promoted by the film's success, Bhimsingh made one more film tilted Oru Nadigai Naadagam Paarkiral, based on his namesake novel.

In 2008, Ravisubramaniyan made a documentary film on Jayakanthan, the second of its kind, and was produced by Ilaiyaraaja. In 2011, Sila Nerangalil Sila Manithargal was adapted into a Malayalam television series Chila Nerangalil Chila Manushyar. In February 2014, Jayakanthan was admitted into a private hospital in Chennai following illness. Following a brief illness, he was discharged after a year, and died on 8 April 2015.

In 2017 his award-winning novel Oru Manithan Oru Veedu Oru Ulagam is being made as a feature film by award-winning filmmaker Kumar G. Venkatesh.

Personal life, influences and political views
Jayakanthan was married to his cousin. The couple had two daughters and a son. Born in a family that had a lot of political activists, Jayakanthan became interested in politics at a young age. He became a strong supporter of the CPI ever since joining the party in the 1950s. He was coaxed to join politics by K. Baladhandayutham of the CPI. While he stood up against the Dravida Munnetra Kazhagam and its leaders for a majority of his lifetime, he supported the CPI leaders for "Nehruvian socialism" and had a great admiration Indira Gandhi. He quit the CPI, and later joined the Tamil Desiyak Katchi, founded by E. V. K. Sampath, before joining the Indian National Congress. He remarked the Liberation Tigers of Tamil Eelam as a "fascist" organisation.

Literary style and themes
A majority of Jayakanthan's works revolve around the lives of underclass people like rickshaw-pullers, prostitutes and rag-pickers. In an interview, he said that during his initial days in Chennai he spent his life amidst such people. This prompted him to develop a liking towards them.

Criticism
Prolific Tamil writer Jeyamohan has written numerous articles about the fictional world in Jayakanthan's works, and also had extensively discussed it in his book Mannum Marabum along with several other authors. Major Tamil critic M. Vedhasagayakumar has made a comparative study on the works of Jayakanthan and Pudhumaipithan. Jayanthasri Balakrishnan did her doctoral research study in Tamil on complete novellas of Jayakanthan. Jayakanthanin ilakkiyathadam, Jayakanthan oru paarvai are the books written on the works of Jayakanthan by Pa. Krishnasamy and K.S. Subramanian respectively.

A full-length documentary made by filmmaker Ravi Subramaniam and other essays by several Tamil writers written after the death of the writer are also considered notableworks on him.

Works of Jayakanthan

Non-fiction
 Oru Ilakkiyavaathiyin Arasiyal Anubhavangal (lit. Political experiences of a literary person; 1974)
 Oru Ilakkiyavaathiyin Kalaiyulaga Anubhavangal (lit. Experiences of a literary person in the world of art; 1980)

Novels and novelettes

 Vazhkkai Azhaikkiradhu. 1957
 Kaivilanggu. 1961
 Yarukkaka Azhuthan?. 1962
 Birammopadhesam. 1963
 Piralayam. 1965
 Karunaiyinal Alla. 1965
 Rishimoolam. 1965
 Yosikkum Velayil (lit. While thinking; 1982)
 Parisukkup Po!. 1966
 Kokila Enna Seythu Vittal?. 1967
 Sila Nerangalil Sila Manithargal. 1970
 Oru Nadikai Nadakam Parkkiral. 1971
 Cinemavukkup Pona Siththal. 1972
 Oru Manidhan Oru Vidu Oru Ulakam. 1973
 Jaya Jaya Sankara. 1977
 Ganggai Engge Pogiral. 1978
 Oru Kudumpaththil N^Adakkirathu. 1979
 Pavam, Ival Oru Pappaththi!. 1979
 Enggenggu Kaninum. 1979
 Oorukku Nooruper. 1979
 Karikkodukal. 1979
  Munggil Kattu Nila. 1979
 Oru Manidhanum Sila Erumaimadukalum. 1979
  Ovvoru Kuraikkum Kizhe. 1980
 Pattimarkalum Peththimarkalum. 1980
 Appuvukku Appa Sonna Kadhaikal. 1980
 Kaththirukka Oruththi. 1980
 Karu. 1981
 Aydha Pusai. 1982
 Sunthara Kandam. 1982
 Isvara Alla There Nam. 1983
 O, Amerikka!. 1983
 Illadhavarkal. 1983
 Idhaya Ranikalum Ispedu Rajakkalum. 1983
 Karru Veliyinile. 1984
 Kazhuththil Vizhuntha Malai. 1984
 Andha Akkavaiththedi. 1985
 Innum Oru Pennin Kadhai. 1986

Film adaptations
 Unnaipol Oruvan (1965; screenwriter and director)
 Kaaval Dheivam (1968) Story (kaivilangu)
 Yaarukkaga Azhudhaan (1966; also screenwriter and director)
 Sila Nerangalil Sila Manithargal (1977)
 Oru Nadigai Natakam Parkiral (1978)
 Ooruku Nooruper (2001)
 Pithamagan (2001) based on his own Nandavanathil Oru Aandi
 Oru Manithan Oru Veedu Oru Ulagam (2017)
 Sarovaram (1993) Malayalam

Short stories
Jayakanthan's portfolio includes 200 short stories.

 Yugasanthi
 Illadhadhu Yedhu
 Irandu Kuzhanthaigal
 Naan Irukkiren
 Bommai
 Devan Varuvaara
 Thuravu
 Poo Uthirum
 Kuraippiravi
 Enthiram
 Treadle
 Pinakku
 Nandavanthil Oar Aandi (made into Pithamagan)
 Nee Inna Sir Solra?
 Puthiya Vaarpugal
 Suya Tharisanam
 Agrahaarathu Poonai
 Agni Pravesam
 Puthu Seruppu Kadikkum
 Naan Enna Seiyattum Sollungo?
 Gurupeetam
 Tea Kadai Samiyaarum Tractor Saamiyaarum
 Nikki
 Oru Veedu Poottikkidakkirathu
 Naan Jannalaruge Utkarnthirukkiren
 Gurukkal Aathu Paiyan
 Munnilavum Pinpaniyum
 Mutrugai
 Sumaithangi
 Nadaipaathaiyil Gnaanopathesam
 Oru Bhakthar

Essays
 Bharathi Padam (1974)
 Imayaththukku Appal (1979)

Awards and honours
 Sahitya Akademi Award for Sila Nerangalil Sila Manithargal (1972)
 Soviet Land Nehru Award in (1978)
 Fellow of Sahitya Akademi (1996)
 Jnanpith Award (2002)
 Padma Bhushan (2009)
 Order of Friendship (2011)
Tamil Nadu State Film Award for Best Story Writer (1978)

See also
 List of Indian writers

References

External links
 

Tamil-language writers
Tamil screenwriters
Tamil activists
1934 births
2015 deaths
Pamphleteers
Recipients of the Jnanpith Award
Recipients of the Sahitya Akademi Award in Tamil
Recipients of the Padma Bhushan in literature & education
People from Cuddalore district
Tamil film directors
20th-century Indian novelists
21st-century Indian novelists
Indian male novelists
Indian male essayists
Indian male short story writers
Tamil writers
Indian male screenwriters
20th-century Indian short story writers
21st-century Indian short story writers
20th-century Indian essayists
21st-century Indian essayists
Screenwriters from Tamil Nadu
20th-century Indian male writers
21st-century Indian male writers
Novelists from Tamil Nadu
Journalists from Tamil Nadu
20th-century Indian journalists
21st-century Indian journalists